Lick Branch is a  long 2nd order tributary to Bearskin Creek in Pittsylvania County, Virginia.

Course 
Lick Branch rises in a pond about 0.5 miles south of Weal, Virginia and then flows south to join Bearskin Creek about 1 mile northeast of Jones Mill.

Watershed 
Lick Branch drains  of area, receives about 45.7 in/year of precipitation, has a wetness index of 395.51, and is about 43% forested.

See also 
 List of Virginia Rivers

References 

Rivers of Virginia
Rivers of Pittsylvania County, Virginia
Tributaries of the Roanoke River